The 1947 Arkansas Razorbacks football team represented the University of Arkansas in the Southwest Conference (SWC) during the 1947 college football season. In their second year under head coach John Barnhill, the Razorbacks compiled a 6–4–1 record (1–4–1 against SWC opponents), finished in a tie for fifth place in the SWC, and outscored their opponents by a combined total of 191 to 145.

Clyde Scott led the Razorbacks in rushing in 1947 with 659 rushing yards on 152 carries (4.3 yard average). Quarterback Kenny Holland was the leading passer, completing 25 of 46 passes for 360 yards. Ross Pritchard was the team's leading receiver with 15 catches for 266 yards.

Schedule

Dixie Bowl

Arkansas was set to play in the inaugural Dixie Bowl, which was the first of only two ever played, against a 9–1 William & Mary team. The Indians got on top early, recovering a Razorback fumbled quick-kick on the Arkansas six yard line, after which Jack Cloud scored from the one to give fourteenth-ranked William & Mary a 7–0 lead. The Indians drove another 78 yards, with Cloud again hitting pay dirt, but QB Stan Magdziak could not convert the extra point, leaving the score 13–0. 
The Razorbacks answered with a 59-yard touchdown pass from Kenny Holland to Ross Pritchard. Moments later, defensive halfback Melvin McGaha would intercept an errant Indian pass and returned it 70 yards for a touchdown. Aubrey Fowler's extra point was true, and the Razorbacks had a one-point lead. 
After halftime, William & Mary took back the lead with a six-yard strike from Magdziak to Henry Bland, but the extra point was again no good. A 97-yard Razorback drive was capped by Leon Campbell sprinting in from seven yards out with five minutes to play to give Arkansas a 21–19 lead, one that would not be relinquished. The crowd of 21,000 watched Arkansas push their record in bowl games to 1–0–2, which could have been 0–0–3 had the Indians converted two extra points.

Arkansas rushed for 103 yards against a William & Mary team that was allowing 61.5 yards per contest, second behind only Penn State's 17 yards per game.

Scoring summary

References

Arkansas
Arkansas Razorbacks football seasons
Arkansas Razorbacks football